A royal christening gown is an item of baptismal clothing used by a royal family at family christenings. Among those presently using such a gown are the royal families of the United Kingdom, Denmark, the Netherlands, Norway, Spain, and Sweden. In most of these families, the tradition goes back over a century: as of 2019, the Swedish gown has been in service for 113 years, the Dutch gown for 139 years, and the Danish gown for 149 years; the current British gown (a replica of the one used for 163 years) has been in use since 2008. The Spanish gown has been in use for 81 years. 

While it is the tradition for these families to reuse the same gowns, some members of these families have decided to use their own purpose-bought gowns for their children. In 1867 for the christening of Prince Christian Victor of Schleswig-Holstein, his mother Princess Helena used a different gown given to her by her mother Queen Victoria; and Prince Joachim of Denmark has favoured using gowns by the Danish designer Henrik Hviid for his children, Prince Nikolai, Prince Felix, Prince Henrik, and Princess Athena.

United Kingdom

The Honiton christening gown or simply royal christening gown is an item of baptismal clothing used by the British royal family at every christening. The original gown was created for the christening of Victoria, Princess Royal, in 1841 and was used by the family until 2004, when it was retired for conservation. Elizabeth II commissioned a replica of the 1841 gown which was first used for the christening of her youngest grandson, James, Viscount Severn, in 2008; this replica gown is the one in use as of 2022.

History
In 1840, Queen Victoria and Prince Albert's first child, Princess Victoria, Princess Royal, was born. For the Princess Royal's christening on 10 February 1841, her parents commissioned both the Lily Font and a new christening gown. The gown was designed by Janet Sutherland, who served as Embroiderer to the Queen. It was made of Honiton lace and Spitalfields silk, and was fashioned after Queen Victoria's wedding dress.

The gown was kept and reused by Victoria for all her children and for all her "English grandchildren" (the children of Albert Edward and Alexandra, Alfred and Marie, Arthur and Louise, Leopold and Helena, and Beatrice and Henry). Subsequent generations of the family also continued to use it, including Victoria's great-grandson Lord Louis Mountbatten.

Five kings, four queens, an empress and a crown princess were christened in the original gown:

In total, the original gown was used by 62 royal children over a period of 163 years, including by the current King, Charles III. Both Charles' sons, his heir apparent William, Prince of Wales, and younger son Prince Harry, Duke of Sussex, were christened in the original gown, while four of their children (George, Charlotte, Louis and Archie) were christened in the replica gown. Lilibet, the daughter of Prince Harry, is not thought to have worn the gown for her christening.

There are strict instructions relating to the care of the gown, including that it be washed by hand with spring water after each use and be stored in a dark room. These measures are meant to slow down the garment's aging process and to preserve it as much as possible. In her journal entry for 15 December 1875, the day of Princess Marie of Edinburgh's christening, Queen Victoria said of the dress' condition: "The Baby was dressed in the old Christening robe, which will hardly hold together!" At that time, the dress was 34 years old.

Replica gown
The 1841 gown was last used in 2004 at the christening of Lady Louise Windsor, 163 years after its first use; Queen Elizabeth II subsequently decided it was too fragile for continued use and had the gown retired. The Queen then commissioned her personal wardrobe advisor Angela Kelly to recreate the original gown. Craftsmen from both the United Kingdom and Italy were involved in the project, so as to ensure that the new gown would be as similar to the original as possible.

The replica gown was first used on 19 April 2008 at James, Earl of Wessex's christening, and has been in use ever since. The gown's most recent use was the christening of Princess Beatrice's daughter, Sienna Mapelli Mozzi, in April 2022.

Denmark

The  (lit. christening gown) was first used in 1870 for the christening of Christian X of Denmark. Three kings and two queens have been baptised in this gown:

Queen Margrethe II's heir apparent, Crown Prince Frederik, and his heir apparent, Prince Christian, have also been baptised in the gown.

This gown is made of Brussels lace, and was bought by Crown Princess Louise in Belgium for her eldest son's christening. The gown was most recently used in 2012 for the christening of Crown Prince Frederik and Crown Princess Mary's son Prince Vincent. Rather than wearing the traditional family gown, Prince Joachim's children have worn gowns designed by Henrik Hviid, while Princess Josephine, Prince Vincent's twin sister, wore a gown found among Queen Ingrid's belongings.

Netherlands

The doopjurk (lit. christening gown) is an item of clothing used by the Dutch royal family at every christening. The original gown was commissioned by Queen Emma for the christening of her daughter Princess Wilhelmina in 1880. 

The Dutch gown has been worn by at least thirteen royal babies over 139 years, accounting for all monarchs since Wilhelmina and their children.

History
In the Netherlands, a christening was usually the first time a royal baby was introduced to the public. Before Wilhelmina's christening in 1880, the mother of the child was not usually present at the service. It was also rare that christenings were held outside of churches.

The gown was hand sewn by Anne Maria Schelfhout-Picnot, a clothing supplier to Queen Emma who specialized in infant clothing. Made of Brussels lace, the gown is decorated with floral motifs and the Dutch royal coat of arms. 
Four Dutch monarchs have been baptised in this gown:

King Willem-Alexander's heir apparent, Catharina-Amalia, Princess of Orange, and his other two daughters, Princess Alexia and Princess Ariane, have also been baptised in this gown. The gown was most recently used at the christening of Princess Ariane in 2007.

The extended royal family
For other members of the Dutch royal house, such as Princess Margriet of the Netherlands and her family, christenings are private occasions, and most have taken place in the chapel of Het Loo Palace. It is also tradition that the baptism is conducted by the minister who officiated at the child's parents' wedding.

Norway

In the Norwegian royal family, all babies since 1920, with the exception of Princess Ingrid Alexandra, have been baptised in a robe that was handmade in 1920 by Princess Ingeborg, Crown Princess Märtha of Norway's mother, and thus grandmother of the current king, Harald. The robe's first wearer was Prince George Valdemar of Denmark, one of Ingeborg's grandchildren, and has since been worn by many Norwegian royal children. The names of the babies are sewn in to the gown.

Princess Ingrid Alexandra, who as of 2022 is second in line to the Norwegian throne, was baptised  in the chapel of the Royal Palace in Oslo on 17 April 2004, wearing the same gown as her great-grandfather King Olav V had worn when he was baptised as Prince Alexander Edward Christian Frederik of Denmark at Sandringham in 1903. This gown had been purchased for him by his grandmother, Queen Alexandra of the United Kingdom.

Spain

The faldón de cristianar (lit. baptismal gown), is the gown used by the Spanish royal family. It was first commissioned in 1938 by the then-exiled Infante Juan and Infanta María de las Mercedes of Spain for their son, Infante Juan Carlos.

This gown is made of beige linen, with satin ribbons and hand-embroidered lace.

History
The gown was first used for the christening of Juan Carlos I in 1938. At this time, the Spanish royal family were in exile in Rome during the Civil War, whilst Spain was under the dictatorship of Francisco Franco. The family were later permitted to return before Juan Carlos' installation as King of Spain, and the first use of the gown in Spain was for the christening of Infanta Elena, Duchess of Lugo in 1963.

Two Spanish monarchs have been christened in this gown:

The other members of the royal family baptised in this gown are:
 1939: Infanta Margarita of Spain (latterly Infanta Margarita, Duchess of Soria and Duchess of Hermani)
 1941: Infante Alfonso of Spain
 1963: Infanta Elena of Spain (latterly Infanta Elena, Duchess of Lugo)
 1965: Infanta Cristina of Spain
 1998: Felipe de Marichalar y Borbón (son of Infanta Elena, Duchess of Lugo and Jaime de Marichalar)
 1999: Juan Urdangarín y de Borbón (son of Infanta Cristina of Spain and Iñaki Urdangarin)
 2000: Victoria de Marichalar y Borbón (daughter of Infanta Elena, Duchess of Lugo and Jaime de Marichalar)
 2001: Pablo Urdangarín y de Borbón (son of Infanta Cristina of Spain and Iñaki Urdangarin)
 2002: Miguel Urdangarín y de Borbón (son of Infanta Cristina of Spain and Iñaki Urdangarin)
 2005: Irene Urdangarín y de Borbón (daughter of Infanta Cristina of Spain and Iñaki Urdangarin)
 2006: Infanta Leonor of Spain (latterly Leonor, Princess of Asturias), current heiress presumptive to the throne
 2007: Infanta Sofía of Spain

Sweden

The Dopklänning (also lit. christening gown), has been in the Swedish royal family's use since the christening of Prince Gustaf Adolf, Duke of Västerbotten in 1906. This gown is made of cotton batiste and Valenciennes lace, with a silk undergarment.

At Princess Margaretha's christening in 1935, her parents, The Duke and Duchess of Västerbotten, commissioned a cream-colored cape and cap to be added to the gown. All the names and dates of the baptisms the gown has been used for since then have been embroidered into the cape. 

One king and one queen have been christened in this gown:

The other royals baptised in this gown are:
 1906: Prince Gustaf Adolf, Duke of Västerbotten
 1907: Prince Sigvard, Duke of Uppland (latterly Sigvard Bernadotte, Count of Wisborg)
 1909: Prince Lennart, Duke of Småland (latterly Lennart Bernadotte, Count of Wisborg)
 1912: Prince Bertil, Duke of Halland 
 1916: Prince Carl Johan, Duke of Dalarna (latterly Carl Johan Bernadotte, Count of Wisborg)
 1935: Princess Margaretha of Sweden 
 1937: Princess Birgitta of Sweden
 1938: Princess Désirée of Sweden
 1943: Princess Christina of Sweden
 1977: Princess Victoria of Sweden (latterly Victoria, Crown Princess of Sweden and Duchess of Västergötland)
 1979: Crown Prince Carl Philip (latterly Prince Carl Philip, Duke of Värmland)
 1982: Princess Madeleine, Duchess of Hälsingland and Gästrikland
 2012: Princess Estelle, Duchess of Östergötland
 2014: Princess Leonore, Duchess of Gotland
 2015: Prince Nicolas, Duke of Ångermanland
 2016, 27 May: Prince Oscar, Duke of Skåne
 2016, 11 October: Prince Alexander, Duke of Södermanland
 2017: Prince Gabriel, Duke of Dalarna
 2018: Princess Adrienne, Duchess of Blekinge
 2021: Prince Julian, Duke of Halland

The gown has been worn by more than twenty royals over 110 years, and was most recently used at the christening of Prince Carl Philip's son, Prince Julian, in 2021.

References

Ceremonial clothing
Christian clothing
British royal attire
British royal family
Danish royalty
Dutch royalty
Spanish royalty
Swedish royalty